Pandankary is a hamlet in Edathua Panchayat, Kuttanadu Taluk, Alapuzha (Alleppey) District, Kerala, India. Being a water-logged area (below sea-level), Pandankary people have to brace the flooding during monsoon season, which happens at least once a year. However, the place has its scenic beauty of backwaters, rural life and well connected with many renowned families who have migrated to many parts of the world, just like a typical Malayalee (those who speak Malayalam language).

References

External links
 Photos of Pandankary on Panoramio

Villages in Alappuzha district